The list of ship launches in 1754 includes a chronological list of some ships launched in 1754.


References

1754
Ship launches